First Born is the first studio album by American hip hop duo Eyedea & Abilities. It was released on Rhymesayers Entertainment on October 1, 2001.

Critical reception

Nathan Rabin of The A.V. Club said, "The album's high-minded excursions into the realm of being and nothingness periodically lurch into navel-gazing self-parody, but Eyedea's passionate delivery and lyrical skills keep the disc grounded." Brad Haywood of Pitchfork gave the album a 7.9 out of 10, stating that "[Eyedea's] rhymes are dense, literate, focused, often surprising and always amusing."

In 2015, HipHopDX included it on the "30 Best Underground Hip Hop Albums Since 2000" list.

Track listing

Personnel
Credits adapted from liner notes.

 Eyedea – vocals, lyrics
 DJ Abilities – production
 Chris Blood – recording, mixing, mastering
 Emily Lazar – mastering
 M. Ward – artwork, design
 Stress – layout

References

External links
 
 

2001 debut albums
Eyedea & Abilities albums
Rhymesayers Entertainment albums